Hornstull metro station is a station on the red line of the Stockholm metro, located in the district of Södermalm. The station was opened on 5 April 1964 as part of the first stretch of the Red line, between T-Centralen and Fruängen.

References

External links
Images of Hornstull

Red line (Stockholm metro) stations
Railway stations opened in 1964